Jason Court (born September 6, 1963) is an American actor, voice actor, and winemaker. He became a winemaker after retiring as an actor in the early 2000s. Court is most famous for playing Kyle Katarn in the cutscenes of Star Wars Jedi Knight: Dark Forces II. The looks of the character from that point forward were based on Jason and his performance.

Filmography

Film

Television

Video games

References

External links
 
 Kyle Katarn Fanpage

1963 births
Living people
American male film actors
American male television actors
American male video game actors
American male voice actors
American winemakers